Xuancheng railway station is a railway station in Xuanzhou District, Xuancheng, Anhui, China.

History
The present-day Xuancheng railway station site opened in January 1975.

References 

Railway stations in Anhui
Railway stations in China opened in 1975